Rimdan may refer to:
 Rimdan-e Avval
 Rimdan-e Bankul
 Rimdan Kamal
 Rimdan-e Shah Vali Mohammad